The 1889 Furman Baptists football team represented Furman University as an independent during the 1889 college football season. Led by William Beattie in his first and only season as head coach, Furman compiled a record of 0–2.

Schedule

References

Furman
Furman Paladins football seasons
College football winless seasons
Furman Baptists football